Kura River (or Cyrus River) may refer to following rivers: 

 Kura (Caspian Sea), a major international river that drains into the Caspian Sea
 Kura (Russia), a river in Russia that drains into the Nogai Steppe
 Kor River (also Kur River) located in the Fars Province of Iran

See also 
 Kura (disambiguation)